Emmerson Nogueira is the eighth studio album by the Brazilian acoustic rock musician Emmerson Nogueira. It was released in 2014 and is his first album to be entirely made of original compositions, instead of the covers he usually works on. Another difference from previous albums is that, instead of working with his backing band Versão Acústica, Nogueira recorded all instruments (acoustic, electric and bass guitar, drums and electric piano) on his own, using the acoustic guitar as the base for composing. The album's songs were composed throughout many years. Some were co-composed with musician Paulinho Cri, dead in 2012, and these were created between 1978 and 1989. All the others are from the 1990s, when Nogueira took part of many music festivals in Minas Gerais. According to him, the inspiration for composing the tracks comes "from life, from the soul, from lost and conquered loves, from the wind, from the perfume of the ridge and from everything that life keeps as a surprise everyday".

Track listing

References 

2014 albums
Emmerson Nogueira albums
Sony Music Brazil albums